Ontario (AG) v Canada (AG), also known as the Local Prohibition Case, was a famous Canadian constitutional decision by the Judicial Committee of the Privy Council. It was one of the first cases to enunciate core principles of the federal peace, order and good government power.

Background

In addition to the scheme provided by the Canada Temperance Act for prohibiting the sale of liquor, the Legislative Assembly of Ontario passed the Local Option Act, which was virtually identically in content. In 1895, the Supreme Court of Canada issued two conflicting judgments on the matter:

 Huson v. South Norwich (Township), where the Ontario law was upheld under the doctrine of double aspect because of provincial jurisdiction over municipal institutions, but a province could not go so far as to prohibit its manufacture and importation.
 Reference Re Provincial Jurisdiction to Pass Prohibitory Liquor Laws, where the same Act was held to be ultra vires provincial jurisdiction, as there was no authority for a province to enact prohibitory legislation.

In both cases, the majority opinions did not question the ability of the Parliament of Canada to enact legislation under its powers relating to peace, order and good government or to trade and commerce.

Ontario appealed to the Privy Council by arguing:

It had jurisdiction over municipal institutions, and such institutions in Ontario possessed the power of prohibition prior to Confederation.
The double aspect doctrine, as articulated in Hodge v. The Queen, meant there was no conflict as the provincial law could not apply if the federal law was in force.
The federal power over trade and commerce had to be confined to its regulation, and not to its prohibition, thereby isolating the federal aspect to the residual clause recognized in Russell.

Judicial Committee

The Board ruled:

Provinces had the power to prohibit trade, but it was based on their jurisdiction over property and civil rights.
The double aspect doctrine applied, subject to the doctrine of paramountcy.
The federal power to regulate trade did not include a power to prohibit it altogether, as no specific head of power in Section 91 could encroach under any head of power assigned to the provinces under Section 92. However, such a power of prohibition could arise under the federal residual power for peace, order and good government.

Lord Watson held that the federal government's residual power allowed it to enact laws that "ought to be strictly confined to such matters as are unquestionably of Canadian interest and importance and ought not to trench upon provincial legislation with respect to any of the classes of subjects enumerated in section 92."

However, he was hesitant to apply that power, as it had the potential to destroy the autonomy of the provinces. He speculated:

Lord Watson formulated a situation in which the residual power could be applied in what would become known as the "national dimensions doctrine."

Aftermath
There has been controversy as to whether it was necessary for Lord Watson to have issued such a broad ruling in this case, and to have defined the federal trade and commerce power in such a restrictive way. It has been suggested that it arose from the views of John Locke on economic liberalism, popular in the 19th century, according to which the power of the state should be focused on ensuring, by regulation, that property is being used productively. Therefore, any measure to prohibit a trade or commerce is to be discouraged.

The Supreme Court's role in issuing such conflicting decisions at the onset likely did not assist in enhancing the Supreme Court's legitimacy so shortly after its establishment in 1875.

The "national dimensions doctrine" was largely ignored for the following 40 years until it arose in its modern form in Ontario v. Canada Temperance Federation.

References

Further reading
 

Canadian federalism case law
Judicial Committee of the Privy Council cases on appeal from Canada
1896 in Canadian case law
Alcohol law in Canada